The  Oakland Raiders season was the franchise's 32nd season in the National Football League (NFL), the 42nd overall, their seventh season since their move back to Oakland, and the fourth year under head coach Jon Gruden, the last of his first stint as the team's head coach. 

In the offseason, the Raiders acquired wide receiver Jerry Rice through free agency. Rice excelled with his new team, catching 83 passes for 1,139 yards and 9 touchdowns. The Raiders finished the season 10–6, finishing in first place in the AFC West for the second consecutive year. Their six regular season losses were by a combined 24 points.

The Raiders qualified for the postseason, beating the New York Jets in the Wild Card round, who were also the team the Raiders lost to in the final game of the regular season. In the Divisional round, the Raiders blew a 13-3 lead and lost to the eventual Super Bowl champion New England Patriots in a controversial finish. With a minute and 43 seconds remaining in the fourth quarter and the Raiders leading 13–10, cornerback Charles Woodson appeared to force a fumble of Patriots' quarterback Tom Brady that was recovered by the Raiders. The play was reviewed by instant replay and the fumble was ruled an incomplete pass. The Patriots tied the game in the ensuing drive and then won in overtime. The game became known as the Tuck Rule Game.

It would be Jon Gruden's final season as head coach in his first stint with the Raiders. After the season he was traded to the Tampa Bay Buccaneers in exchange for Tampa Bay's first-round draft picks in 2002 and 2003, their second-round draft picks in 2004 and 2005, and $8 million in cash. The Raiders faced Gruden and the Tampa Bay Buccaneers in the Super Bowl the next year, and lost 48–21. Gruden would return to the Raiders as head coach 16 years later in 2018.

The Raiders' theme song was Veridis Quo by Daft Punk.

Offseason

NFL draft

Staff

Final roster 

|}

Regular season

Schedule

Standings

Playoffs

AFC Wild Card Playoff

AFC Divisional Playoff

References 

Raiders on Pro Football Reference

Oakland Raiders seasons
Oakland
AFC West championship seasons
Oakland